Deirdre O'Kane (born 25 March 1968) is a Drogheda born, Irish stand-up comedian and actress.

Biography

Originally from Drogheda, County Louth, O'Kane is married to writer and director Stephen Bradley; they have two children. She attended Loreto Abbey, an all-girls Catholic boarding school in Rathfarnham, Dublin.

Career

Stand-up comic

O'Kane became a stand-up comic in 1996 and got into the finals of the BBC New Comedy Awards of that year. She has played at the Edinburgh Festival every year since including 2001 where she not only performed her own solo show, Deirdre O'Kane is Crystallized, but also the two-hander Tis Pity She's Anonymous. She has also played The Melbourne, Adelaide and Kilkenny Cat Laughs Festivals and has toured the Middle East, Hong Kong, Shanghai, Prague, Brussels and London.

Theatre

O'Kane began her career as an actress and has played every major theatre in Ireland as well as touring in Australia, Canada and the UK. Leading roles include Mary in Juno and the Paycock (National Theatre), Miss Funny in At the Black Pig's Dyke (Druid Theatre Co.) and Daphne in Present Laughter (Gate Theatre).

Movies

She portrayed the role of Noeleen in the 2003 motion picture Intermission, directed by John Crowley.
She played the lead role in the 2014 biopic Noble as Christina Noble, a children's rights campaigner, charity worker and writer, who founded the Christina Noble Children's Foundation in 1989.

Television

Television credits include hosting the ten-part TV series of stand-up comedy and sketches called The Lounge (RTÉ) which included guests such as Rich Hall, Adam Hills, Jeff Green and Dara Ó Briain. She also played the role of Fiona in Owen O'Neill's sit-com The Fitz (BBC).

In 2001, O'Kane (described in The Sunday Times as "absolutely superb") played the leading role of Helen in Paths to Freedom, a six-part spoof-documentary for RTÉ/BBC Choice and starred in the RTÉ comedy series, Fergus's Wedding.

In 2012, she took on the part of Debra Moone, in Sky's comedy Moone Boy.

In 2016, she made a guest appearance on the British TV show As Yet Untitled and told an anecdote about her car being double clamped by over efficient clampers to whom she was rude over the phone. Alan liked her stories enough to consider naming the episode after one of her quotes: "Would you ever fuck off?".

O'Kane is one of the narrators of the Irish version of Gogglebox, alongside Rory Cowan which started in 2016 on TV3. In 2018, she was a runner-up on the second series of the Irish version of Dancing With The Stars.

In October 2021, The Deirdre O'Kane Show launched on Sky Max. The five-part series features Bill Bailey, Ardal O’Hanlon, Joanne McNally, Jason Byrne, Reginald D. Hunter, Neil Delamere, Emma Doran, Des Bishop, Catherine Bohart and Martin Angolo. Hip-hop comedian, Rob Broderick, a.k.a. Abandoman, also features on the show.

In September 2021, she became a judge on the Irish talent show The Big Deal along with Boy George, Jedward, Lyra, and Aston Merrygold.

References

External links

 
 Official site

1968 births
20th-century Irish comedians
21st-century Irish comedians
Living people
Irish stand-up comedians
Irish television actresses
Irish women comedians
People from Drogheda